Cape Breton Centre-Whitney Pier, formerly Cape Breton Centre is a provincial electoral district in Cape Breton, Nova Scotia, Canada, that elects one member of the Nova Scotia House of Assembly.

Its Member of the Legislative Assembly is Kendra Coombes. The district consists of the area around New Waterford, including Dominion, Grand Lake Road, Reserve Mines, Gardiner Mines, Lingan Road, Lingan, River Ryan, Scotchtown, New Victoria, Victoria Mines, South Bar.

It was created in 1925 when the counties of Cape Breton and Richmond were divided into three electoral districts. In 2003, it expanded west to include New Victoria. In 2013, it gained South Bar, Lingan Road, and part of Grand Lake Road from Cape Breton Nova.

It was re-named Cape Breton Centre-Whitney Pier for the 2021 Nova Scotia general election.

Members of the Legislative Assembly
This riding has elected the following Members of the Legislative Assembly:

Single-member district (1933-present)

Dual-member district (1925-1933)

Election results

1925 general election

1928 general election

1933 general election

1937 general election

1941 general election

1945 general election

1949 general election

1953 general election

1956 general election

1960 general election

1963 general election

1967 general election

1970 general election

1974 general election

1978 general election

1981 general election

1984 general election

1988 general election

1993 general election

1998 general election

1999 general election

2003 general election

2006 general election

2009 general election

2013 general election 

 
|New Democratic Party
|Frank Corbett
|align="right"|3,440
|align="right"|45.29
|align="right"|-33.25
|-
 
|Liberal
|David Wilton
|align="right"|3,282
|align="right"|43.21
|align="right"|+30.71
|-
 
|Progressive Conservative
|Edna Lee
|align="right"|873
|align="right"|11.49
|align="right"|+4.14

|}

2015 by-election

2017 general election

2020 by-election

2021 general election

References

Elections Nova Scotia, Summary Results from 1867 to 2011. Retrieved June 28, 2014
Elections Nova Scotia, Complete Results and Statistics (October 30, 1956). Retrieved June 28, 2014
Elections Nova Scotia, Complete Results and Statistics (June 7, 1960). Retrieved June 28, 2014
Elections Nova Scotia, Complete Results and Statistics (October 8, 1963). Retrieved June 28, 2014
Elections Nova Scotia, Complete Results and Statistics (May 30, 1967). Retrieved June 28, 2014
Elections Nova Scotia, Complete Results and Statistics (October 13, 1970). Retrieved June 28, 2014
Elections Nova Scotia, Complete Results and Statistics (April 2, 1974). Retrieved June 28, 2014
Elections Nova Scotia, Complete Results and Statistics (September 19, 1978). Retrieved June 28, 2014
Elections Nova Scotia, Complete Results and Statistics (October 6, 1981). Retrieved June 28, 2014
Elections Nova Scotia, Complete Results and Statistics (November 6, 1984). Retrieved June 28, 2014
Elections Nova Scotia, Complete Results and Statistics (September 6, 1988). Retrieved June 28, 2014
Elections Nova Scotia, Return of By-Elections for the House of Assembly 1989 and 1990. Retrieved June 28, 2014
Elections Nova Scotia, Complete Results and Statistics (May 25, 1993). Retrieved June 28, 2014
Elections Nova Scotia, Complete Results and Statistics (March 24, 1998). Retrieved June 28, 2014
Elections Nova Scotia, Complete Results and Statistics (July 27, 1999). Retrieved June 28, 2014
Elections Nova Scotia, Complete Results and Statistics (August 5, 2003). Retrieved June 28, 2014
Elections Nova Scotia, Complete Results and Statistics (June 13, 2006). Retrieved June 28, 2014
Elections Nova Scotia, Complete Poll by Poll Results (June 9, 2009). Retrieved June 28, 2014

External links
 Electoral history for Cape Breton Centre
 2013 riding profile

Nova Scotia provincial electoral districts
Politics of the Cape Breton Regional Municipality